Augustine Gbao (born 13 August 1948), also spelled as Augustine Bao, is a former paramilitary commander of the Revolutionary United Front (RUF) in the Sierra Leone Civil War. In February 2009, he was convicted of war crimes and crimes against humanity by the Special Court for Sierra Leone and sentenced to 25 years in prison. He was a senior commander in the RUF from 1991 until his capture in 2002.

After serving time in Rwanda for war crimes since 2009, Gbao was returned to Blama on 23 December 2020 to serve the remainder of his 25-year sentence.

References

1948 births
Living people
Sierra Leonean military personnel
Sierra Leonean people convicted of crimes against humanity
People convicted by the Special Court for Sierra Leone
Sierra Leonean people convicted of war crimes
Revolutionary United Front politicians
People from Kenema District